The Federal Motor Truck Company was an American truck manufacturer headquartered in Detroit, Michigan. The company was founded in 1910 as Bailey Motor Truck Company by Martin L. Pulcher, who would later found the Oakland Motor Car Company, which launched the Pontiac GM companion brand, in 1926.

History 
The company was founded in 1910, as the Bailey Motor Truck Company, but was later renamed to Federal. The company then opened a factory in Leavitt Street, near Southwest Detroit. During the prosperous time of the company, around 700 people worked there, producing as many as 3,500 trucks annually. The main competitor of the company was Diamond T. The main provider of engines for the company were Continental, Waukesha, and Hercules.

The company later producing some delivery trucks, with Willys-Knight engines, and these were marketed under the Federal Knight brand. Despite being an independent manufacturer, the company produced its own cabs, in both standard and deluxe versions. In 1942, the company bought the Stewart Motor Company. After the war, the company enjoyed high sales, and was bought by Fawick, although it was soon discovered, that the new buyers knew nothing about manufacturing complete trucks, and the company was sold to NAPCO, that closed down the company's factory in Detroit, and transferred the trucks' tooling in their own factories in Minneapolis.

Due to economic problems and the uncertainty of the future of the Federal brand, NAPCO retired the brand in 1959, with all operations ceasing in 1960.

Military trucks
Federal built its first U.S. military trucks in 1918, for the U.S. Army. More diverse military (tractor) trucks, including tank transporters, dump trucks, and heavy wreckers, were built for U.S. forces from 1933 through 1945. Federal produced over 10,000 trucks for the military.

Gallery

References

Defunct motor vehicle manufacturers of the United States
American companies established in 1910
Companies with year of disestablishment missing
Manufacturing companies based in Detroit